A sparsity matroid is a mathematical structure that captures how densely a multigraph is populated with edges.  To unpack this a little, sparsity is a measure of density of a graph that bounds the number of edges in any subgraph. The property of having a particular matroid as its density measure is invariant under graph isomorphisms and so it is a graph invariant.

The graphs we are concerned with generalise simple directed graphs by allowing multiple same-oriented edges between pairs of vertices. Matroids are a quite general mathematical abstraction that describe the amount of indepdendence in, variously, points in geometric space and paths in a graph; when applied to characterising sparsity, matroids describe certain sets of sparse graphs.  These matroids are connected to the structural rigidity of graphs and their ability to be decomposed into edge-disjoint spanning trees via the Tutte and Nash-Williams theorem.  There is a family of efficient algorithms, known as pebble games, for determining if a multigraph meets the given sparsity condition.

Definitions 
-sparse multigraph..

-tight multigraph.

-sparse and tight multigraph.   A multigraph  is -sparse if there exists a subset  such that the subgraph  is -sparse and the subgraph  is -sparse.  The multigraph  is -tight if, additionally, .

-sparsity matroid.   The -sparsity matroid is a matroid whose ground set is the edge set of the complete multigraph on  vertices, with loop multiplicity  and edge multiplicity , and whose independent sets are -sparse multigraphs on  vertices.  The bases of the matroid are the -tight multigraphs and the circuits are the -sparse multigraphs  that satisfy .

The first examples of sparsity matroids can be found in.  Not all pairs  induce a matroid.

Pairs (k,l) that form a matroid 

Theorem.   The -sparse multigraphs on  vertices are the independent sets of a matroid if

Some consequences of this theorem are that -sparse multigraphs form a matroid while -sparse multigraphs do not.  Hence, the bases, i.e., -tight multigraphs, must all have the same number of edges and can be constructed using techniques discussed below.  On the other hand, without this matroidal structure, maximally -sparse multigraphs will have different numbers of edges, and it is interesting to identify the one with the maximum number of edges.

Connections to rigidity and decomposition 
Structural rigidity is about determining if almost all, i.e. generic, embeddings of a (simple or multi) graph in some -dimensional metric space are rigid.  More precisely, this theory gives combinatorial characterizations of such graphs.  In Euclidean space, Maxwell showed that independence in a sparsity matroid is necessary for a graph to be generically rigid in any dimension.

Maxwell Direction.   If a graph  is generically minimally rigid in -dimensions, then it is independent in the -sparsity matroid.

Other sparsity matroids have been used to give combinatorial characterizations of generically rigid multigraphs for various types of frameworks, see rigidity for other types of frameworks.  The following table summarizes these results by stating the type of generic rigid framework in a given dimension and the equivalent sparsity condition.  Let  be the multigraph obtained by duplicating the edges of a multigraph   times.

The Tutte and Nash-Williams theorem shows that -tight graphs are equivalent to graphs that can be decomposed into  edge-disjoint spanning trees, called -arborescences.  A -arborescence is a multigraph  such that adding  edges to  yields a -arborescence.  For , a -sparse multigraph is a -arborescence; this was first shown for  sparse graphs.  Additionally, many of the rigidity and sparsity results above can be written in terms of edge-disjoint spanning trees.

Constructing sparse multigraphs 
This section gives methods to construct various sparse multigraphs using operations defined in constructing generically rigid graphs.  Since these operations are defined for a given dimension, let a -extension be a -dimensional -extension, i.e., a -extension where the new vertex is connected to  distinct vertices.  Likewise, a -extension is a -dimensional -extension.

General (k,l)-sparse multigraphs 
The first construction is for -tight graphs. The usual -extension is a -extension.

Theorem.   A multigraph is -tight if and only if it can be constructed from a single vertex via a sequence of - and -extensions.

This theorem was then extended to general -tight graphs. Also, let  denote a multigraph with a single node and  loops.

Theorem.   A multigraph  is -tight for

Neither of these constructions are sufficient when the graph is simple.  The next results are for -sparse hypergraphs.  A hypergraph is -uniform if each of its edges contains exactly  vertices.  First, conditions are established for the existence of -tight hypergraphs.

Theorem.   There exists an  such that for all , there exist -uniform hypergraphs on  vertices that are -tight.

The next result extends the Tutte and Nash-Williams theorem to hypergraphs.

Theorem.

A -map-hypergraph is a map-hypergraph that can be decomposed into  edge-disjoint map-hypergraphs.

Theorem.

(2,3)-sparse graphs 

The first result shows that -tight graphs, i.e., generically minimally rigid graphs in  have Henneberg-constructions.

Theorem.   A graph  is -tight if and only if it can be constructed from the complete graph  via a sequence of - and -extensions.

The next result shows how to construct -circuits.  In this setting, a -sum combines two graphs by identifying two  subgraphs in each and then removing the combined edge from the resulting graph.

Theorem.   A graph  is a -circuit if and only if it can be constructed from disjoint copies of the complete graph  via a sequence of -extensions within connected components and -sums of connected components.

The method for constructing -connected -circuits is even simpler.

Theorem.   A graph  is a -connected -circuit if and only if it can be constructed from the complete graph  via a sequence of -extensions.

These circuits also have the following combinatorial property.

Theorem.   If a graph  is a -circuit that is not the complete graph , then  has at least  vertices of degree  such that performing a -reduction on any one of these vertices yields another -circuit.

(2,2)-sparse graphs 
The next results shows how to construct -circuits using two different construction methods. For the first method, the base graphs are shown in Figure 2 and the three join operations are shows in Figure 2.

Theorem.  A graph  is a -circuit if and only if
  can be constructed from disjoint copies of the base graphs via a sequence of -extensions within connected components and -, -, and - sums of connected components;
  can be constructed from  via a sequence of - and -extensions, vertex-to-, and -dimensional vertex-splitting operations

(2,1)-sparse graphs 
The following result gives a construction method for -tight graphs and extends the Tutte and Nash-Williams theorem to these graphs. Also, an edge-joining operation adds a single edge between two graphs.

Theorem.   A graph  is -tight if and only if

  is the edge-disjoint union of a spanning tree and a spanning graph in which every connected component contains exactly one cycle.

Pebble games 
There is a family of efficient network-flow based algorithms for identifying -sparse graphs, where .  The first of these types of algorithms was for -sparse graphs.  These algorithms are explained on the Pebble game page.

References 

Graph invariants